El Canario is a Cuban village and hamlet belonging to the municipality of Primero de Enero, in Ciego de Avila Province. It has a population of 41.

Economy
The economy is centered in the agriculture of sugarcane, livestock, coal, and growing various crops.

Education
El Canario has a primary school for children attending first to sixth grade.

Health
Residents have access to a Medico de Familia clinic and a pharmacy that provide health services in the nearby village of Pablo.

See also

Pablo (village)

References

Populated places in Ciego de Ávila Province